Naruebet Kuno, nicknamed Boss, is a Thai director, best known for his work with GDH 559 and Nadao Bangkok.

Naruebet grew up in Hat Yai, and graduated school from Hatyaiwittayalai School. He then attended Chulalongkorn University in Bangkok, under the Faculty of Communication Arts where he directed the faculty's annual play and also became known from a viral video promoting the 69th Chula–Thammasat Traditional Football Match in 2013. After graduating, he was invited by Kriangkrai Vachiratamporn to join the writing team of the third season of popular television series Hormones, and later also became a co-director. In 2016, Kriangkrai and Nadao Bangkok CEO Songyos Sugmakanan invited him to direct a segment in their new series Project S. Naruebet created "Side by Side", a drama about an autistic teen playing competitive badminton with his cousin, writing the screenplay with Pattaranad Bhiboonsawad. The series was very positively received, and Naruebet went on to direct Nadao's 2019 series My Ambulance and 2020's I Told Sunset About You.

Awards and nominations

References

Naruebet Kuno
Naruebet Kuno
Naruebet Kuno
Year of birth missing (living people)
Living people